Culliford is an English surname. Notable people with the surname include:

James Culliford (1927–2002), British actor
Robert Culliford (17th century), English pirate
Pierre Culliford (1928–1992), better known as Peyo, Belgian creator of the Smurfs

See also
Culliford Tree Hundred

English-language surnames